Methanothermus sociabilis is a species of methanogen.
It is found solely in the solfataric fields in Iceland. The cells are bar-shaped and grow strictly through the reduction of carbon dioxide with hydrogen, producing methane.

References

Further reading

Vân Trâǹ, J. Thanh, ed. Frontiers of Life. Vol. 3. Atlantica Séguier Frontières, 1992.

External links

LPSN
Type strain of Methanothermus sociabilis at BacDive -  the Bacterial Diversity Metadatabase

Euryarchaeota